The (Western) Omo–Tana or Arboroid languages belong to the Afro-Asiatic family and are spoken in Ethiopia and Kenya.  

The languages are: 
Arbore
Daasanach
El Molo
Yaaku
The first three have long been recognized as related; ; Bender (2020) adds Yaaku, whose classification had been obscure.
The El Molo language of Kenya is nearly extinct.

Notes 

 
East Cushitic languages
Languages of Ethiopia
Languages of Kenya